The 2021 Euro Hockey League Women was the first edition of the Euro Hockey League Women, Europe's premier women's club field hockey tournament, organized by the European Hockey Federation.

It was held alongside the men's tournament behind closed doors at the Wagener Stadium in Amstelveen, Netherlands from 3 to 5 April 2021.

The tournament was originally scheduled to be held with eight teams from six countries. Due to the COVID-19 restrictions in the Netherlands the tournament was reduced to four teams with the four original seeded teams qualifying.

Final4

Bracket

Semi-finals

Third and fourth place

Final

Statistics

Final standings
 Den Bosch
 Club de Campo
 Amsterdam
 Club an der Alster

Goalscorers

See also
2021 Euro Hockey League
2021 Women's EuroHockey Indoor Club Cup

References

External links

Women's Euro Hockey League
Euro Hockey League Women
Euro Hockey League Women
International women's field hockey competitions hosted by the Netherlands
Euro Hockey League Women
Sports competitions in Amstelveen
Euro Hockey League Women